Dodok Anang Zuanto (born January 13, 1983 in Sidoarjo, East Java) is an Indonesian footballer that currently plays for Persela Lamongan in the Indonesia Super League.

References

External links

1983 births
Living people
People from Sidoarjo Regency
Sportspeople from East Java
Association football defenders
Indonesian footballers
Liga 1 (Indonesia) players
Deltras F.C. players
Indonesian Premier Division players
Mitra Kukar players
Persegi Gianyar players
PSSB Bireuen players
Sriwijaya F.C. players
Persela Lamongan players